Stagmomantis montana (Rehn, 1935), common name Mountain mantis, is a species of praying mantis in the family Mantidae.  They are native to Mexico and Central America.  S. montana sinaloae has been identified as a subspecies.

References

Mantidae
Mantodea of North America
Insects of Central America
Insects of Mexico
Insects described in 1935